William Carr Lane (December 1, 1789January 6, 1863) was a doctor and the first mayor of St. Louis, Missouri, serving from 1823 to 1829 and 1837 to 1840. He later served as Governor of New Mexico Territory, from 1852 to 1853.

Born in Fayette County, Pennsylvania, to Presley Carr Lane and Sarah "Sallie" Stephenson, Lane attended college in Pennsylvania and studied medicine in Louisville, Kentucky. He entered the U.S. Army, and was appointed post surgeon at Fort Harrison on the Wabash River north of Terre Haute, Indiana, in 1816. He resigned from the army in 1819 to enter private practice. He married on February 26, 1818, in Vincennes, Indiana, to Miss Mary Ewing, daughter of Nathaniel Ewing and Ann Breading.  Their children were Anne Ewing Lane (1819–1904), Sarah L. Lane (1821–1887), and Victor Carr Lane (1831–1848).

Lane served as St. Louis's first mayor from 1823 to 1829, when the city's population was around 4,000. He oversaw the first public health system in the city, free public schools, and street improvements, including the paving of Main Street. Lane helped erect the city's first town hall. He was also instrumental in beautifying the city with fountains and greenery. The City Seal was adopted, and election procedures were written. Perhaps the most memorable event of his service was an 1825 visit by Lafayette. Lane served again as mayor from 1837 to 1840. 

In 1852, President Millard Fillmore appointed him governor of the New Mexico Territory. During his tenure, Lane seized disputed land in the Mesilla Valley that he had no authority over. He sought to use the land as a route for the transcontinental railroad, but President Franklin Pierce did not approve of the seizure. Further tensions over the disputed land were eased when James Gadsden purchased it. After this service, Lane returned to St. Louis and practiced medicine until his death in 1863. He was buried at Bellefontaine Cemetery. A street in St. Louis is named in his honor.

References

External links
 Richard Edwards & Merna Hopewell, Edwards's Great West and Her Commercial Metropolis (1860) p. 571 "William Carr Lane, First Mayor of St. Louis"
William Carr Lane at the St. Louis Public Library Mayors Exhibit website.

1789 births
1863 deaths
Physicians from Missouri
Mayors of St. Louis
Governors of New Mexico Territory
People from Fayette County, Pennsylvania
Missouri Whigs
19th-century American politicians
New Mexico Whigs